The Transformers: Megatron Origin is a comic book limited series by IDW Publishing exploring the origin of Megatron in its rebooted G1 universe. Written by Eric Holmes, the story explored the beginnings of the Decepticons and the Great War, and serves as a prequel to the various IDW G1 Transformers stories such as The Transformers: Infiltration, Stormbringer, Spotlight and Escalation. Alex Milne is the artist with alternative covers by Marcelo Matere. The series is available in The Transformers: Volume 1.

Background
IDW editor-in-chief Chris Ryall first revealed the existence of the story on his message board, originally to be titled Megatron: Precursor. The first issue of Megatron: Origin was released in June 2007, and the limited series continues the overall title, following Escalation and before the debut of The Transformers: Devastation.

According to the Holmes, Megatron, as a smart character with a determined drive, has always been his favorite Transformer. "Those are the people that change the world. He deserves an interesting tale to have made him what he is." Inspired by Simon Furman's Transformers: The War Within for Dreamwave Productions, which created an origin for Optimus Prime, Holmes felt it would be fun to go back and further explore the beginnings of the Autobot-Decepticon war.  Holmes originally approached Dreamwave with the concept, but the company went bankrupt before anything could be published. When IDW took over the Transformers license, they were approached by Holmes as well, loved his idea and he collaborated with Furman to further tie-in the story into the continuity of the IDW-published Transformers comics. Holmes took historical inspiration from the decline of the Roman Empire in his story of the war's beginnings.

Plot

Release
Issue 1 was originally supposed to be released in May 2007, but was delayed to June due to artist Alex Milne's illness.

Notes

Megatron Origin
IDW Publishing titles
Comic book limited series
2007 comics debuts
2007 comics endings